Mykola Platonovych Bazhan (– 23 November 1983) was a Soviet Ukrainian writer, poet, highly decorated political and public figure. He was an academician of the Academy of Sciences of the Ukrainian SSR (1951), Merited Science Specialist of Ukrainian SSR (1966), Merited Art Specialist of Georgian SSR (1964), People's Poet of Uzbek SSR.

Career
Bazhan was a People's Deputy of the Supreme Soviet of the Soviet Union for two of five convocations (1946–1962), and the Supreme Council of the Ukrainian SSR for six of nine convocations (1963–1980). He was a member of the Central Committee of the Communist Party of the Soviet Union and was elected to the Central Committee of the Communist Party of the Ukrainian SSR on several occasions at the party's congresses (17 of and 21 of 25). In 1943–49 Bazhan was a Deputy Chairman of the Council of Minister (Commissars) of the Ukrainian SSR.

Biography
Mykola Bazhan was born in city of Kamenyets, an administrative center of Podolia Governorate, yet his youth years he spent in Uman, Kiev Governorate. His father Platon Artemovych Bazhan, a native of Poltava region, was a military cartographer and a veteran of the Ukrainian People's Army.

In 1923 Mykola Bazhan graduated from the Uman Cooperative College and moved to Kiev where he studied at a cooperative institute at first and later at an institute of foreign relations. He was active in the Futurist literary movement, and his first poem was published in Kiev in 1923 and his first book "Seventeenth Patrol" in Kharkiv in 1926. In 1926 he married a Ukrainian writer and native of Kiev Hayina Kovalenko. They divorced in 1938, and he remarried, to Nina Lauer, shortly thereafter. 

During the 1930s Bazhan's works were viewed as "anti-proletarian" and became a subject of a number official anti-nationalist campaigns. In 1937 he felt his arrest was imminent and he rarely slept at home. In 1939 Bazhan was awarded the Order of Lenin for his translation into Ukrainian of the epic poem "The Warrior in the Tiger's skin" by the medieval Georgian poet Shota Rustaveli. Bazhan found out about this, from a newspaper, while hiding from his imminent arrest in a city park in Kiev. He was eventually told by Nikita Khrushchev that his arrest had been ordered, but Stalin was fond of his Rustaveli translation, and changed his mind.  In 1940 Mykola Bazhan joined the Communist Party of the Soviet Union and in the same year became a member of the Presidium of the Writers' Union of Ukraine.  

During the Great Patriotic War Bazhan became a military reporter and the editor of the newspaper For the Soviet Ukraine. In 1943 he published a book, Stalingrad Notebook, for which in 1946 he received the Stalin Prize. In 1953-59 Bazhan headed the Writer's Union of Ukraine. During the "Khrushchev thaw", on July 2, 1956 he raised before the Central Committee of the Communist Party of Ukraine the issue of rehabilitation several repressed writers: Vasyl Bobynsky, Hryhorii Epik, Ivan Kulyk, Mykola Kulish, and many more.

In 1970 Bazhan was nominated for a Nobel Prize in literature, but he was forced by Soviet authorities to write a letter refusing his candidature.

From 1957 and until his death, Bazhan was the founding chief editor of the Main Edition of Ukrainian Soviet Encyclopedia publishing. The publishing was not completed in his lifetime; the first edition was, however, as the initial Ukrainian Soviet Encyclopedia in 17 volumes was released 1959–1965. A second (and final, as events would develop) 12-volume work was released 1977–1985. The enterprise was additionally responsible for a large number of other major Ukrainian reference works. Bazhan also was one of co-authors of the Anthem of the Ukrainian Soviet Socialist Republic. He died in Kiev in 1983.

Moisei Fishbein, a notable Ukrainian poet was Bazhan's literary secretary.

Bazhan in English
A collection of English translations of Bazhan's futurist poetry titled Quiet Spiders of the Hidden Soul was published by the Academic Studies Press
in 2019.

Awards and prizes

 Shota Rustaveli State Prize of the Georgian SSR (1937)
 Order of Lenin (1939, 1954, 1960, 1964, 1974)
 Order of the Red Banner (1940s)
 Stalin Prize (1946, 1949)
 Order of the Red Banner of Labour (1948, 1967)
 Taras Shevchenko State Prize of the Ukrainian SSR (1965)
 State Prize of the Ukrainian SSR (1971)
 Hero of Socialist Labour (1974)

External links
  Bazhan's poetry in English translation

References

This article may be expanded with text translated from the corresponding article in the Russian Wikipedia.

1904 births
1983 deaths
People from Kamianets-Podilskyi
People from Kamenets-Podolsky Uyezd
Central Committee of the Communist Party of the Soviet Union members
Vice Prime Ministers of Ukraine
Third convocation members of the Supreme Soviet of the Soviet Union
Fourth convocation members of the Supreme Soviet of the Soviet Union
Fifth convocation members of the Supreme Soviet of the Soviet Union
Sixth convocation members of the Verkhovna Rada of the Ukrainian Soviet Socialist Republic
Seventh convocation members of the Verkhovna Rada of the Ukrainian Soviet Socialist Republic
Eighth convocation members of the Verkhovna Rada of the Ukrainian Soviet Socialist Republic
Ninth convocation members of the Verkhovna Rada of the Ukrainian Soviet Socialist Republic
Tenth convocation members of the Verkhovna Rada of the Ukrainian Soviet Socialist Republic
Soviet male poets
Ukrainian male poets
20th-century Ukrainian poets
20th-century male writers
Translators of William Shakespeare
Members of the National Academy of Sciences of Ukraine
Heroes of Socialist Labour
Stalin Prize winners
Lenin Prize winners
Recipients of the Order of Lenin
Recipients of the Order of the Red Banner
Recipients of the Order of the Red Banner of Labour
Recipients of the Shevchenko National Prize
Rustaveli Prize winners
Burials at Baikove Cemetery
Ukrainian avant-garde